Justinian the Great (483–565) was Byzantine Emperor from 527 to 565 noted for his codification of Law.

Justinian may also refer to:

People
Iustinianus (magister militum in Gaul) (d. 407), Roman general
Justinian II Rhinotmetus (669–711), Byzantine Emperor from 685 to 695 and again from 705 to 711
Justinian (magister militum per Orientem) (c. 525–582), Byzantine general, nephew of Justinian I
Justinian of Ramsey Island (Jestin, Iestin), 6th-century Welsh hermit

Other uses
Justinian (novel), a novel by Harry Turtledove
Justiniana Prima, a Byzantine city that existed from 535 to 615
Justinian (1787 ship), a storeship sent to the convict settlement at New South Wales in 1790
SS Justinian, a Norwegian cargo ship in service from 1946 to 1954

People with the surname
St. Lawrence Justinian (Lorenzo Giustiniani; 1381–1456), first Patriarch of Venice

People with the given name
Sir Justinian Isham, 2nd Baronet (1610–1675), English scholar and politician
James Justinian Morier (1782–1849), British diplomat and author
Justinian Rweyemamu (1942–1982), Tanzanian economist and mathematician
Justinian Marina (1901–1977), Patriarch of the Romanian Orthodox Church from 1948 to 1977
Justinian Serédi (1884–1945), Roman Catholic cardinal and Primate of Hungary
Justinian Tamusuza (born 1951), Ugandan composer

See also
Giustiniani, a Venetian family 
Giovanni Giustiniani (1418–1453), navy captain, from the Genoese branch of the family